Evergestis osthelderi is a moth in the family Crambidae. It was described by Schawerda in 1932. It is found in Turkey.

References

Evergestis
Moths described in 1932
Moths of Asia